Don't Be Bad is a 2015 Italian drama film directed by Claudio Caligari. The film was selected as the Italian entry for the Best Foreign Language Film at the 88th Academy Awards but it was not nominated. It was the last film directed by Caligari: a few days after the end of the film editing, he died from a tumor.

Plot
Ostia, 1995: Vittorio and Cesare, two Roman youngsters, have known each other for a long time; their relationship is closer to being brothers than just friends. Both are dedicated to their acquaintances with various illegal activities as well as to the consumption and sale of recreational drugs, refusing the life of workers and looking for a way out from the problems of life by taking drugs. Cesare lives with his mother and niece Debora, the daughter of his sister who died due to AIDS, and who is ill herself.

One evening Vittorio, after taking several pills, has a series of hallucinations and therefore decides to change his life. He finds work at a construction site and tries to involve Cesare in order to save him too. The new life slowly takes shape, amidst all kinds of difficulties, including drug repercussions and the death of little Debora, but in the end the two begin to adapt to a more normal life. Cesare becomes engaged to Viviana, a former girlfriend of Vittorio, while Vittorio goes to live with Linda, a housewife, and her son Tommaso.

However, Cesare is not able to completely suppress the desire to return to his former life. He dies after he is shot by a store owner during a failed robbery attempt. One year later, Vittorio meets Viviana and her son, Cesare Jr., named after his late father.

Cast
 Luca Marinelli as Cesare 
 Alessandro Borghi as Vittorio
 Roberta Mattei as Linda
 Silvia D'Amico as Viviana
 Alessandro Bernardini as Brutto
 Valentino Campitelli as Grasso
 Danilo Cappanelli as Lungo
 Manuel Rulli as Corto

Awards

See also
 List of submissions to the 88th Academy Awards for Best Foreign Language Film
 List of Italian submissions for the Academy Award for Best Foreign Language Film

References

External links
 

2015 films
2015 drama films
Italian drama films
2010s Italian-language films
Films about drugs
Films set in 1995
Films set in Rome
Films directed by Claudio Caligari